Wu Qiang may refer to:

 Wu Qiang (officeholder)
 Wu Qiang (rower)